The National Museum in Szczecin is a national museum in Szczecin, Poland, established on 1 August 1945. The museum features ancient and modern art, archaeological, historical, numismatic, nautical and ethnographic collections and is divided into six branches, five located in Szczecin and one in Gryfice.

Departments
The six branches are:
Main Building of the Muzeum Narodowe w Szczecinie, Wały Chrobrego 3 – Maritime Museum
Szczecin's History Museum, Old Town Hall, Księcia Mściwoja II 8
Museum of Regional Traditions, Staromłyńska 27
Museum of Contemporary Art, Staromłyńska 1
Dialogue Center "Breakthroughs" (Polish: Centrum Dialogu „Przełomy”), Solidarności 1 Square
Narrow Gauge Railway Exhibition in Gryfice

Old Art Gallery collection

See also
List of museums in Poland

External links
National Museum, Szczecin, Official website
National Museum, Szczecin, Facebook fan page

National museums of Poland
Art museums and galleries in Poland
Buildings and structures in Szczecin
History of Szczecin
Art museums established in 1945
1945 establishments in Poland
Museums in West Pomeranian Voivodeship
Registered museums in Poland
Culture in Szczecin
Old Town, Szczecin